Noel Desmond Daly (10 February 1929 − 14 January 2004) was an Australian Catholic bishop.

Ordained to the priesthood on 27 July 1952, Daly was named bishop of the Diocese of Sandhurst, Australia in 1979 and resigned in 2000.

References 

1929 births
2004 deaths
People from Victoria (Australia)
Roman Catholic bishops of Sandhurst
Knights Commander of the Order of Merit of the Federal Republic of Germany
20th-century Roman Catholic bishops in Australia